Ninepoints (also known as Nine Points) is an unincorporated community in Bart Township in Lancaster County, Pennsylvania, United States. Ninepoints is located at the intersection of Pennsylvania Route 896 and Noble Road.

References

Unincorporated communities in Lancaster County, Pennsylvania
Unincorporated communities in Pennsylvania